The Luxembourg men's national under-20 basketball team is a national basketball team of Luxembourg, administered by the Luxembourg Basketball Federation. It represents the country in international men's under-20 basketball competitions.

FIBA U20 European Championship participations

See also
Luxembourg men's national basketball team
Luxembourg men's national under-18 basketball team
Luxembourg women's national under-20 basketball team

References

External links
Archived records of Luxembourg team participations

Basketball in Luxembourg
Basketball
Men's national under-20 basketball teams